Imed Trabelsi (born August 26, 1974 in Tunis) is a businessman, politician, and favorite nephew of Leïla Ben Ali, the former First Lady of Tunisia, Trabelsi was formerly the mayor of La Goulette, Tunisia. Under Ben Ali's regime, Trabelsi controlled the construction and alcohol industry in Tunisia, in addition to operating a franchise of the French company Bricorama.

Biography
Imed Tabelsi and Moaz Trabelsi (also a nephew of Leïla Ben Ali), were both accused of the 2006 theft of a yacht owned by the French businessman Bruno Roger, chairman of the company Lazard. Imed and Moaz were suspected after the yacht was found in Sidi Bou Said. Although prosecutors brought the case to court in France, the French judge ruled the trial should take place in Tunisia. Trabelsi was found to be innocent by a Tunisian judge.  Both Imed and Moaz were placed on an Interpol wanted list. The yacht was returned to its owner.

After President Zine El Abidine Ben Ali stepped down from power and fled the country as a result of the Tunisian Revolution, Imed Trabelsi was prevented from leaving Tunisia by a pilot and was imprisoned in a "military hospital". His house in La Marsa was looted. Al Jazeera reported that Trabelsi had been killed on January 15.

Although some initial reports stated that he had been killed by a mob while at the Tunisian airport or stabbed by a fisherman in La Goulette, most reported that Trabelsi died in a military hospital after being stabbed Later reports by the Tunisian government indicated that Trabelsi was alive and being questioned by the government. He appeared in court on April 20, 2011 for drug consumption charges and is awaiting sentencing and further prosecutions. The trial has been postponed until May 7, with the judge who presided over Trabelsi's yacht theft trial being named to the case. In 2014, he began a hunger strike to protest against his placement in total isolation and the conditions of his detention, then he stayed in hospital until his health improved. In 2015, he was sentenced to five years in prison, in a case of illegal granting of lands in Carthage.

References

1974 births
People from Tunis
Tunisian politicians
Tunisian businesspeople
Mayors of places in Tunisia
Living people